Cowboys from Hell is the fifth studio album by American heavy metal band Pantera, released on July 24, 1990, by Atco Records. It marked the band's major label debut and their first collaboration with producer Terry Date. This was also the album where Pantera started to tone down the glam style of their previous albums in favor of a heavier sound inspired by that of Black Sabbath and Judas Priest, as well as bands from the then-current heavy metal scene such as Metallica, Slayer, Faith No More, Soundgarden and Overkill. It has been recognized as one of the first ever groove metal albums.

Writing and recording
Writing sessions for Cowboys from Hell took place throughout 1988 and 1989. After being turned down "28 times by every major label on the face of the Earth", Atco Records representative Mark Ross was asked by his boss, Derek Shulman (who was interested in signing Pantera), to see the band perform after Hurricane Hugo stranded him in Texas. Ross was so impressed by the band's performance that he called his boss that night, suggesting that Pantera be signed to the label.

Ross on the performance:
"By the end of the first song, my jaw was on the floor. The sonic power of it all — the attitude and the musicianship — blew me away. Basically, you had to be an idiot to not think they're amazing. I mean, how could you see these guys and not think, 'Holy shit!'?"

Atco Records accepted but the band had to wait a six month period before they commenced recording at Pantego Sound Studio in Pantego, Texas. Accounts vary as to how long the recording sessions of Cowboys from Hell lasted; bassist Rex Brown stated in a 2010 interview with Metal Hammer that the recording sessions took place from February to April 1990, however vocalist Phil Anselmo has also claimed that the album was recorded in 1989. Pantera's initial choice as the producer for Cowboys from Hell was Max Norman based on his work with Ozzy Osbourne. Norman, who flew to Houston to watch the band perform, initially agreed to work on the album, but right before the recording sessions started, he was offered to produce Lynch Mob's debut album Wicked Sensation instead. Pantera then proposed Terry Date to produce the album on the strength of his work with Soundgarden, Metal Church and Overkill, the latter of whose latest album at the time The Years of Decay had influenced Dimebag Darrell's guitar tone, as well as the band's transition away from glam/traditional heavy metal to thrash/groove metal.

Pantera adopted a new sound and attitude, and the writing of what would become Cowboys from Hell saw the band exploring darker subject matters, while the guitar would be notably heavier. The band recorded a self-produced demo album in 1989 which featured 11 tracks, 10 of which would make the album cut. The last two tracks to be written were "Clash with Reality" and "Primal Concrete Sledge", while a song entitled "The Will to Survive" would be discarded early in the recording sessions. During recording sessions, the band chose an unorthodox method: Vinnie Paul recorded the drum tracks first, then Darrell recorded the guitar, and Brown recorded the bass with the guitars only. This resulted in a tighter sound; slight inaccuracies were fixed by manually editing the tapes.

The band were feeling confident about their material and themselves, finally feeling that they were making the kind of album they believed in. One key track to emerge during the writing was "Cemetery Gates", a seven-minute power ballad that would be the first song to show both their diversity and Anselmo's vocal range; the acoustic intro was written last by Brown. Although they had already recorded four albums prior to Cowboys from Hell, the members of Pantera have since acknowledged this as their official debut album, working with a professional producer and a major label for the first time and creating music that was not simply stealing from other similar bands in an attempt to attract attention.

Artwork
The cover art depicts the band in a quaint Western saloon. In reality, it is a 1910 photo of the "Cosmopolitan Saloon" in Telluride, Colorado, with the bandmembers pasted over it. Diamond Darrell is pictured in the center playing guitar, while Vinnie Paul is standing to his right counting money, Rex Brown is leaning against the counter top and Phil Anselmo is shown jumping in the air to Brown's left. Anselmo states that he jumped off a bar stool to get high up in the air and that it took him about ten takes until the cameramen got the shot of the desired style.

Release and reception

The album was released on July 24, 1990, and was available on tape, CD, vinyl and a limited edition version (same album but in a long box).

Commercial performance
The album would become the band's breakthrough record as it became their first album to chart in 1992, reaching No. 27 on the Billboard Top Heatseekers. In March 1995, the album entered the Swedish Charts for one week managing to peak at No. 46. It has since gone on to attain both Gold (500,000 units) and Platinum (1,000,000 units) certifications in the U.S. as well as Gold status in the U.K. for sales of 100,000.

Critical reception
The album has been praised by most critics as it would prove to be one of the most influential albums in the metal scene in the 1990s and of all time, and would inspire a generation of musicians, particularly guitarists. IGN named Cowboys from Hell the 19th-most-influential heavy metal album of all time.

They said of the album:

AllMusic said of the album:

Reissue
On September 14, 2010, a 20th anniversary edition was released with a remastered mix from the original analog recordings. The expanded edition features a bonus CD of previously unreleased live recordings and the Alive and Hostile EP. The deluxe edition features an additional third CD with the previously unreleased demo track "The Will to Survive" (parts of the song were later used in the song "This Love" from Vulgar Display of Power) along with demo versions of ten songs from the original album.

The third disc of the deluxe set, Cowboys from Hell: The Demos, was released as a separate limited edition vinyl LP at the same time. It was exclusively available at Metal Club record stores. The 2010 reissue of the album managed to reach No. 117 on the Billboard 200 and No. 8 on Catalog Albums, selling 4,200.

Legacy
The album was ranked No. 11 on the October 2006 issue of Guitar World magazine's list of the greatest 100 guitar albums of all time. It was ranked the 85th-best heavy metal album of all time by Metal-Rules.com. IGN named Cowboys from Hell the 19th-most-influential heavy metal album of all time. It is also credited as "defining" groove metal. The album has also been praised by Ozzy Osbourne, who in 2017 listed it among his ten favourite metal albums.

Touring
Pantera toured alongside thrash acts Exodus and Suicidal Tendencies. In 1991, Rob Halford performed with the band onstage, which led Pantera (along with Annihilator) to open for Judas Priest on its first show in Europe. They also opened for bands like Sepultura, Fates Warning, Prong, Mind Over Four and Morbid Angel, and co-headlined a North American tour with Wrathchild America. The band eventually landed a billing for the Monsters of Rock festival with AC/DC, Mötley Crüe, Metallica and The Black Crowes in September 1991, where they played to a crowd of over 500,000 in celebration of the new freedom of performing Western music in the former Soviet Union shortly before its collapse three months later.

Track listing

Disc 2: Expanded Edition bonus CD

Disc 3: Cowboys from Hell: The Demos
Only available on the 'Deluxe' and 'Ultimate' editions of the album.

Cowboys from Hell: The Demos
The demos were recorded in 1989 and re-released on Black Friday 2010. Copies were limited to 3,000 180-gram pressings, with the vinyl including the custom cover and demos of the original tracks, as well as the previously unreleased demo cut "The Will to Survive".

Track listing 

Note
Demos of the album's tracks were also released in 2010, in the 20th anniversary edition of Cowboys from Hell, but with a different track listing.

Personnel
Pantera
Phil Anselmo – vocals
Diamond Darrell – guitars
Rex Brown (credited as Rex) – bass, acoustic guitar and piano (track 5)
Vinnie Paul – drums

Technical
Terry Date – producer, engineer, mixing
Pantera – producer, engineer, mixing
Matt Lane – assistant engineer
Matt Gililland – assistant engineer
Howie Weinberg – audio mastering

Charts

Certifications

|-

References

External links
Complete Guide to Pantera 'Cowboys From Hell' at Ultimate-Guitar.com

1990 albums
Albums produced by Terry Date
Atco Records albums
Pantera albums